The Malakandi National Park is a protected territory situated in the Kaghan Forest Division of the Mansehra District, Khyber Pakhtunkhwa province in Pakistan.

History
The provincial government designated it a national park in January 2022 in an effort to protect and conserve the flora and animals, as well as their habitats in varied ecosystems. This park is situated among the Nuri Bichla and Chitta Par reserve forests in the Jared subdivision, as well as the Malakand, Mukhair, and Manna reserve forests in the Balakot subdivision. It covers an area of 19,971 acres.

References

National parks of Pakistan
Mansehra District
Protected areas of Khyber Pakhtunkhwa
Protected areas established in 2022
Parks in Khyber Pakhtunkhwa
2022 establishments in Pakistan